William Oliver Stone (born September 15, 1946) is an American film director, producer, and screenwriter. Stone won an Academy Award for Best Adapted Screenplay as writer of Midnight Express (1978), and wrote the gangster film remake Scarface (1983). Stone achieved prominence as writer and director of the war drama Platoon (1986), which won Academy Awards for Best Director and Best Picture. Platoon was the first in a trilogy of films based on the Vietnam War, in which Stone served as an infantry soldier. He continued the series with Born on the Fourth of July (1989)—for which Stone won his second Best Director Oscar—and Heaven & Earth (1993). Stone's other works include the Salvadoran Civil War-based drama Salvador (1986); the financial drama Wall Street (1987) and its sequel Wall Street: Money Never Sleeps (2010); the Jim Morrison biographical film The Doors (1991); the satirical black comedy crime film Natural Born Killers (1994); a trilogy of films based on the American Presidency: JFK (1991), Nixon (1995), and W. (2008); and Snowden (2016).

Many of Stone's films focus on controversial American political issues during the late 20th century, and as such were considered contentious at the times of their releases. They often combine different camera and film formats within a single scene, as demonstrated in JFK (1991), Natural Born Killers (1994), and Nixon (1995).

Like his subject matter, Stone has become a controversial figure in American filmmaking, with some critics accusing him of promoting conspiracy theories, and of misrepresenting real-world events and figures in his works. He has frequently been critical of American foreign policy, which he considers to be driven by nationalist and imperialist agendas. In addition, he has approved of politicians such as Hugo Chávez, and interviewed several world leaders, including Vladimir Putin.

Early life
Stone was born in New York City, the son of a French woman named Jacqueline (née Goddet) and Louis Stone (born Louis Silverstein), a stockbroker. He grew up in Manhattan and Stamford, Connecticut. His parents met during World War II, when his father was fighting as a part of the Allied force in France. Stone's American-born father was Jewish, whereas his French-born mother was Roman Catholic, both non-practicing. Stone was raised in the Episcopal Church, and now practices Buddhism.

Stone attended Trinity School in New York City before his parents sent him away to The Hill School, a college-preparatory school in Pottstown, Pennsylvania. His parents divorced abruptly while he was away at school (1962) and this, because he was an only child, marked him deeply. Stone's mother was often absent and his father made a big impact on his life—perhaps because of this, father-son relationships feature heavily in Stone's films.

He often spent parts of his summer vacations with his maternal grandparents in France, both in Paris and La Ferté-sous-Jouarre in Seine-et-Marne. Stone also worked at 17 in the Paris mercantile exchange in sugar and cocoa – a job that proved inspirational to Stone for his film Wall Street. He speaks French fluently. Stone graduated from The Hill School in 1964.

Stone was admitted to Yale University but left in June 1965 at age 18 to teach high school students English for six months in Saigon at the Free Pacific Institute in South Vietnam. Afterwards, he worked for a short while as a wiper on a United States Merchant Marine ship in 1966, traveling from Asia to Oregon across the rough Pacific Ocean in January. He returned to Yale, where he dropped out a second time (in part due to working on an autobiographical novel, "A Child's Night Dream," published in 1997 by St. Martin's Press).

U.S. Army
In April 1967, Stone enlisted in the United States Army and requested combat duty in Vietnam. From September 27, 1967, to February 23, 1968, he served in Vietnam with 2nd Platoon, B Company, 3rd Battalion, 22nd Infantry Regiment, 25th Infantry Division and was twice wounded in action. He was then transferred to the 1st Cavalry Division participating in long-range reconnaissance patrols before being transferred again to drive for a motorized infantry unit of the division until November 1968. For his service, his military awards include the Bronze Star with "V" Device for valor, the Purple Heart with Oak Leaf Cluster to denote two awards, the Air Medal, the Army Commendation Medal, Sharpshooter Badge with Rifle Bar, Marksman Badge with Auto Rifle Bar, the National Defense Service Medal, the Vietnam Service Medal with one Silver Service Star, the Republic of Vietnam Gallantry Cross with Unit Citation with Palm, two Overseas Service Bars, the Vietnam Campaign Medal and the Combat Infantryman Badge.

Awards and honors

(while with the U.S. Army)

Writing and directing career

1970s

Stone graduated from New York University with a Bachelor of Fine Arts degree in film in 1971, where his teachers included director and fellow NYU alumnus Martin Scorsese. The same year, he had a small acting role in the comedy The Battle of Love's Return. Stone made a short, well received 12-minute film Last Year in Viet Nam. He worked as a taxi driver, film production assistant, messenger, and salesman before making his mark in film as a screenwriter in the late 1970s, in the period between his first two films as a director: horror films Seizure and The Hand.

In 1979, Stone was awarded his first Oscar, after adapting true-life prison story Midnight Express into the successful film of the same name for British director Alan Parker (the two men would later collaborate on the 1996 movie of stage musical Evita). The original author, Billy Hayes, around whom the film is set, said the film's depiction of prison conditions was accurate. Hayes said that the "message of 'Midnight Express' isn't 'Don't go to Turkey. It's 'Don't be an idiot like I was, and try to smuggle drugs.' " Stone later apologized to Turkey for over-dramatizing the script, while standing by the film's stark brutality of Turkish prisons.

1980s
Stone wrote further features, including Brian De Palma's drug lord epic Scarface, loosely inspired by his own addiction to cocaine, which he successfully kicked while working on the screenplay. He also penned Year of the Dragon (co-written with Michael Cimino) featuring Mickey Rourke, before his career took off as a writer-director in 1986. Like his contemporary Michael Mann, Stone is unusual in having written or co-written most of the films he has directed. In 1986, Stone directed two films back to back: the critically acclaimed but commercially unsuccessful Salvador, shot largely in Mexico, and his long in-development Vietnam project Platoon, shot in the Philippines.

Platoon brought Stone's name to a much wider audience. It also finally kickstarted a busy directing career, which saw him making nine films over the next decade. Alongside some negative reaction, Platoon won many rave reviews (Roger Ebert later called it the ninth best film of the 1980s), large audiences, and Academy Awards for Best Picture and Best Director. In 2007, a film industry vote ranked it at number 83 in an American Film Institute "AFI's 100 Years ... 100 Movies" poll of the previous century's best American movies. British TV channel Channel 4 voted Platoon as the sixth greatest war film ever made. In 2019, Platoon was selected by the Library of Congress for preservation in the United States National Film Registry for being "culturally, historically, or aesthetically significant".

Platoon was the first of three films Stone has made about the Vietnam War: the others were Born on the Fourth of July and Heaven & Earth, each dealing with different aspects of the war. Platoon is a semi-autobiographical film about Stone's experience in combat; Born on the Fourth of July is based on the autobiography of US Marine turned peace campaigner Ron Kovic; Heaven & Earth is based on the memoir When Heaven and Earth Changed Places, in which Le Ly Hayslip recalls her life as a Vietnamese village girl drastically affected by the war and who finds another life in the USA.

Stone also directed Wall Street, which was released in December 1987. Lead performer Michael Douglas received an Academy Award for Best Actor for his role as a ruthless Wall Street corporate raider, and Talk Radio, based on Eric Bogosian's Pulitzer-nominated play.

1990s
The Doors, released in 1991, received criticism from former Doors keyboardist Ray Manzarek during a question and answer session at Indiana University East in 1997. During the discussion, Manzarek stated that he sat down with Stone about the Doors and Jim Morrison for over 12 hours. Patricia Kennealy-Morrison—a rock critic and author—was a consultant on the movie, in which she makes a cameo appearance, but she writes in her memoir Strange Days: My Life With and Without Jim Morrison (Dutton, 1992) that Stone ignored everything she told him and proceeded with his own version of events. From the moment the movie was released, she blasted it as untruthful and inaccurate. The other surviving former members of the band, John Densmore and Robby Krieger, also cooperated with the filming of Doors, but Krieger distanced himself from the work before the film's release. However, Densmore thought highly of the film, and in fact celebrated its DVD release on a panel with Oliver Stone.

During this same period, Stone directed one of his most ambitious, controversial and successful films: JFK, depicting the assassination of John F. Kennedy on November 22, 1963. In 1991, Stone showed JFK to Congress on Capitol Hill, which helped lead to passage of the Assassination Materials Disclosure Act of 1992. The Assassination Records Review Board (created by Congress to lessen, but not end the secrecy surrounding Kennedy's assassination) discussed the film, including Stone's observation at the end of the film, about the dangers inherent in government secrecy. Stone published an annotated version of the screenplay, in which he cites references for his claims, shortly after the film's release. He stated "I make my films like you're going to die if you miss the next minute. You better not go get popcorn."

Stone's satire of the modern media, Natural Born Killers was released in 1994. Originally based on a screenplay by Quentin Tarantino, but significantly rewritten by Stone, Richard Rutowski, and David Veloz, critics recognized its portrayal of violence and the intended satire on the media. Before it was released, the MPAA gave the film a NC-17 rating; this caused Stone to cut four minutes of film footage in order to obtain an R rating (he eventually released the unrated version on VHS and DVD in 2001). The film was the recipient of the Grand Special Jury Prize at the Venice Film Festival that year.

In the same year he appear in a cameo as himself in the presidential comedy Dave.

Stone went on to direct the 1995 Richard Nixon biopic Nixon, which received multiple Oscar nominations for script, John Williams' score, Joan Allen as Pat Nixon and Anthony Hopkins' portrait of the title role. Stone followed Nixon with the 1997 road movie/film noir, U Turn, and 1999's Any Given Sunday, a film about power struggles within and without an American football team.

2000s

After a period from 1986 to 1999, where he released a new film at least every 1–2 years, Stone slowed down in the 2000s, though still finding some success.

In 2004, Stone directed Alexander. He later re-edited his biographical film of Alexander the Great into a two-part, 3-hour 37-minute film Alexander Revisited: The Final Cut, which became one of the highest-selling catalog items from Warner Bros. He further refined the film and in 2014 released the two-part, 3-hour 26-minute Alexander: The Ultimate Cut. After Alexander, Stone went on to direct World Trade Center, based on the true story of two PAPD policemen who were trapped in the rubble and survived the September 11 attacks.

Stone wrote and directed the George W. Bush biopic W., chronicling the former President's childhood, relationship with his father, struggles with his alcoholism, rediscovery of his Christian faith, and continues the rest of his life up to the 2003 invasion of Iraq.

2010s

In 2010, Stone returned to the theme of Wall Street for the sequel Wall Street: Money Never Sleeps. In 2012, Stone directed Savages, based on a novel by Don Winslow.

In 2015, he was presented with an honorific award at the Sitges Film Festival. His film Snowden, starring Joseph Gordon-Levitt as whistleblower Edward Snowden. Snowden finished filming in May 2015 and was released on September 16, 2016. He received the 2017 Cinema for Peace Award for Justice for such film.

On May 22, 2017, various industry papers reported that Stone was going to direct a television series about the Guantanamo detention camp. Daniel Voll was credited with creating the series. Harvey Weinstein's production company is financing the series. It was reported that Stone was scheduled to direct every episode of the first season. However, Stone announced he would quit the series after sexual misconduct allegations surfaced against Weinstein in October 2017.

2020s
In July 2020, Stone teamed with Houghton Mifflin Harcourt to release his first memoir, titled Chasing the Light: Writing, Directing, and Surviving Platoon, Midnight Express, Scarface, Salvador, and the Movie Game, which chronicles his turbulent upbringing in New York City, volunteering for combat in Vietnam, and the trials and triumphs of moviemaking in the 1970s and '80s. The book, which ends on his Oscar-winning Platoon, was praised by The New York Times: "The Oliver Stone depicted in these pages — vulnerable, introspective, stubbornly tenacious and frequently heartbroken—may just be the most sympathetic character he's ever written... neatly sets the stage for the possibility of that rarest of Stone productions: a sequel."

Documentaries

Stone made three documentaries on Fidel Castro: Comandante (2003), Looking for Fidel, and Castro in Winter (2012). He made Persona Non Grata, a documentary on Israeli-Palestinian relations, interviewing several notable figures of Israel, including Ehud Barak, Benjamin Netanyahu, and Shimon Peres, as well as Yasser Arafat, leader of the Palestine Liberation Organization.

In 2009, Stone completed a feature-length documentary, South of the Border about the rise of leftist governments in Latin America, featuring seven presidents: Hugo Chávez of Venezuela, Bolivia's Evo Morales, Ecuador's Rafael Correa, Cuba's Raúl Castro, the Kirchners of Argentina, Brazil's Lula da Silva, and Paraguay's Fernando Lugo, all of whom are critical of US foreign policy in South America. Stone hoped the film would get the rest of the Western world to rethink socialist policies in South America, particularly as it was being applied by Venezuela's Hugo Chávez. Chávez joined Stone for the premiere of the documentary at the Venice International Film Festival in September 2009. Stone defended his decision not to interview Chávez's opponents, stating that oppositional statements and TV clips were scattered through the documentary and that the documentary was an attempt to right a balance of heavily negative coverage. He praised Chávez as a leader of the Bolivarian Revolution, a movement for social transformation in Latin America, and also praised the six other presidents in the film. The documentary was also released in several cities in the United States and Europe in the mid-2010.

In 2012, the documentary miniseries Oliver Stone's Untold History of the United States premiered on Showtime, Stone co-wrote, directed, produced, and narrated the series, having worked on it since 2008 with co-writers American University historian Peter J. Kuznick and British screenwriter Matt Graham. The 10-part series is supplemented by a 750-page companion book of the same name, also written by Stone and Kuznick, published on October 30, 2012, by Simon & Schuster. Stone described the project as "the most ambitious thing I've ever done. Certainly in documentary form, and perhaps in fiction, feature form." The project received positive reviews from former Soviet President Mikhail Gorbachev, The Guardian journalist Glenn Greenwald, and reviewers from IndieWire, San Francisco Chronicle, and Newsday. Hudson Institute adjunct fellow historian Ronald Radosh accused the series of historical revisionism, while journalist Michael C. Moynihan accused the book of "moral equivalence" and said nothing within the book was "untold" previously. Stone defended the program's accuracy to TV host Tavis Smiley by saying "This has been fact checked by corporate fact checkers, by our own fact checkers, and fact checkers [hired] by Showtime. It's been thoroughly vetted ... these are facts, our interpretation may be different than orthodox, but it definitely holds up." A review of Untold History at The Huffington Post by filmmaker Robert Orlando, a self-described fan of Stone's films, said there were "two flawed assumptions that underlie their master theory. First is the notion that the central conflict of the 20th century can be laid at the feet of a right-wing military conspiracy... Stone's second flawed assumption in Untold History is that capitalism coordinated the military-industrial complex's agenda." Amidst other criticisms of Stone's documentary series and accompanying book The Untold History of the United States, Daily Beast contributor Michael Moynihan accused him of using untrustworthy sources, such as Victor Marchetti, whom Moynihan described as an antisemitic conspiracy theorist published in Holocaust denial journals. Moynihan wrote that: "There are hints at dark forces throughout the book: business interests controlled by the Bush family that were (supposedly) linked to Nazi Germany, a dissenting officer in the CIA found murdered after disagreeing with a cabal of powerful neoconservatives, suggestions that CIA director Allen Dulles was a Nazi sympathizer."

Stone was interviewed in Boris Malagurski's documentary film The Weight of Chains 2 (2014), which deals with neoliberal reforms in the Balkans.

On March 5, 2014, Stone and teleSUR premiered the documentary film Mi amigo Hugo (My Friend Hugo), a documentary about Venezuela's late President, Hugo Chávez, one year after his death. The film was described by Stone as a "spiritual answer" and tribute to Chávez. At the end of 2014 according to a Facebook post Stone said he had been in Moscow to interview (former Ukrainian president) Viktor Yanukovych, for a "new English language documentary produced by Ukrainians".

Two years later in 2016, Stone was executive producer for Ukrainian-born director Igor Lopatonok's film Ukraine on Fire, a documentary written by Vanessa Dean. In the film, Lopatonok showed the historic background of divisions in the region; Stone interviewed ousted president Yanukovych and Russian president Vladimir Putin about the removal of Yanukovych in the 2014 Maidan Revolution. Narratives in the film such as by the late investigative journalist Robert Parry described the rise of US-funded NGOs active in the area and suggested that the Maidan Revolution was a US-backed coup d'état.

Stone's series of interviews with Russian president Putin over the span of two years was released as The Putin Interviews, a four-night television event on Showtime on June 12, 2017. On June 13, Stone and Professor Stephen F. Cohen joined John Batchelor in New York to record an hour of commentary on The Putin Interviews.

In June 2021, Stone's documentary JFK Revisited: Through the Looking Glass was selected to be shown in the Cannes Premiere section at the 2021 Cannes Film Festival. He also released Qazaq: History of the Golden Man that year, an eight-hour film consisting of Stone interviewing Kazakh politician and former leader Nursultan Nazarbayev. The movie has been criticized for its non-confrontational approach in the interview and because no opposition members were interviewed, according to some critics this resulted in a promotion of the authoritarian rule and cult of personality of Nazarbayev.

Other work
On September 15, 2008, Stone was named the artistic director of New York University's Tisch School of the Arts Asia in Singapore.

Stone contributed a chapter to the 2012 book Last Word: My Indictment of the CIA in the Murder of JFK by Mark Lane and published by Skyhorse Publishing. Skyhorse has published numerous other books with forewords or an introduction by Stone, namely The JFK Assassination, Reclaiming Parkland: Tom Hanks, Vincent Bugliosi, and the JFK Assassination in the New Hollywood, The Plot to Overthrow Venezuela: How the US is orchestrating a coup for oil, Snowden:The Official Motion Picture Edition, The Putin Interviews and JFK: The CIA, Vietnam, and the Plot to Assassinate John F. Kennedy which features a quote from Stone on the newest edition's cover: "Blows the lid right off our 'Official History.

In 2022, he appeared in Theaters of War, discussing the role of the military in Hollywood.

Influences
Stone listed Greek-French director Costa-Gavras as an early significant influence on his films. Stone mentioned that he "was certainly one of my earliest role models,...I was a film student at NYU when Z came out, which we studied. Costa actually came over with Yves Montand for a screening and was such a hero to us. He was in the tradition of Gillo Pontecorvo's The Battle of Algiers and was the man in that moment... it was a European moment."

Personal life

Family

Stone has been married three times, first to Najwa Sarkis on May 22, 1971. They divorced in 1977. He then married Elizabeth Burkit Cox, an assistant in film production, on June 7, 1981. They had two sons, Sean Stone/Ali (b. 1984) and Michael Jack (b. 1991). Sean appeared in some of his father's films while a child. Sean Stone has worked for the Russia state media company RT America since 2015. Oliver and Elizabeth divorced in 1993. Stone is now married to Sun-jung Jung from South Korea, and the couple have a daughter, Tara (b. 1995). Stone and Sun-jung live in Los Angeles.

Religion and humanism
Stone is mentioned in Pulitzer Prize-winning American author Lawrence Wright's book Going Clear: Scientology, Hollywood, and the Prison of Belief as having been a member of Scientology for about a month, saying "It was like going to college and reading Dale Carnegie, something you do to find yourself." In 1997, Stone was one of 34 celebrities to sign an open letter to then-German Chancellor Helmut Kohl, published as a newspaper advertisement in the International Herald Tribune, which protested against the treatment of Scientologists in Germany and compared it to the Nazis' oppression of Jews in the 1930s. In 2003, Stone was a signatory of the third Humanist Manifesto.

Legal issues
In 1999, Stone was arrested and pleaded guilty to alcohol and drug charges. He was ordered into a rehabilitation program. He was arrested again on the night of May 27, 2005, in Los Angeles for possession of an undisclosed illegal drug. He was released the next day on a $15,000 bond. In August 2005, Stone pleaded no contest and was fined $100.

Sexual harassment allegations
In 2017, former Playboy model Carrie Stevens alleged that in 1991, Stone had "walked past me and grabbed my boob as he waltzed out the front door of a party."

The allegation Stevens made surfaced after Stone announced he would no longer direct The Weinstein Company's television series Guantanamo following the revelation of the Harvey Weinstein sexual misconduct allegations. Stone also drew criticism for his comments on Harvey Weinstein himself, saying

I'm a believer that you wait until this thing gets to trial. I believe a man shouldn't be condemned by a vigilante system. It's not easy what he's going through, either. During that period he was a rival. I never did business with him and didn't really know him. I've heard horror stories on everyone in the business, so I'm not going to comment on gossip. I'll wait and see, which is the right thing to do.

Later that day, however, he withdrew his remarks, saying that he had been unaware of the extent of the allegations due to his travel schedule. "After looking at what has been reported in many publications over the last couple of days, I'm appalled and commend the courage of the women who've stepped forward to report sexual abuse or rape," he said.

Melissa Gilbert accused Stone of "sexual harassment" during an audition for The Doors in 1991. She alleged that Stone told her to get on her hands and knees and say, "Do me baby". Gilbert reportedly refused and left the audition in tears, calling it humiliating. Stone released a statement denying the accusation. The film's casting director, Risa Bramon Garcia, contradicted her story as well, saying, "No actor was forced or expected to do anything that might have been uncomfortable, and most actors embraced the challenge".

Political views

Stone has been described as having left-wing political views. He has also drawn attention for his opinions on controversial world leaders such as Adolf Hitler, Joseph Stalin and Hugo Chávez. In Showtime's The Putin Interviews, Stone called Joseph Stalin "the most famous villain in history, next to Adolf [Hitler]", who "left a horrible reputation, and stained the [Communist] ideology forever ... it's mixed with blood, and terror." Stone has endorsed the works of author and United States foreign policy critic William Blum, saying that his books should be taught in schools and universities.

U.S. presidential politics
Stone served as a delegate for Jerry Brown's campaign in the 1992 Democratic Party presidential primaries and spoke at the 1992 Democratic National Convention.

Stone has suggested a link between 9/11 and the controversies of the 2000 election: "Does anybody make a connection between the 2000 election and the events of September 11th? ... Look for the thirteenth month!"

According to Entertainment Weekly, Stone voted for Barack Obama as President of the United States in both the 2008 and 2012 elections. Stone was quoted as saying at the time: "I voted for Obama because ... I think he's an intelligent individual. I think he responds to difficulties well ... very bright guy ... far better choice yes." In 2012, Stone endorsed Ron Paul for the Republican nomination for president, citing his support for a non-interventionist foreign policy. He said that Paul is "the only one of anybody who's saying anything intelligent about the future of the world." then later: "I supported Ron Paul in the Republican primary ... but his domestic policy ... made no sense!" In March 2016, Stone wrote on The Huffington Post indicating his support for Vermont U.S. Senator Bernie Sanders for the 2016 Democratic nomination. In September 2016, Stone said he was voting for Green Party candidate Jill Stein for president.

Speaking at the San Sebastián film festival, Stone said that many Americans had become disillusioned with Barack Obama's policies, having originally thought he would be "a man of great integrity." He said: "On the contrary, Obama has doubled down on the (George W.) Bush administration policies," and "has created...the most massive global security surveillance state that's ever been seen, way beyond East Germany's Stasi".

In April 2018, Stone attended a press conference at the Fajr Film Festival in Tehran, where he likened President Donald Trump to "Beelzebub", the biblical demonic figure. Although Stone voted for Joe Biden in 2020, he criticized what he perceived to be the hypocrisy of the Democratic Party; Stone argued that the Democrats were not concerned about Russian interference as they had been in 2016. He reflected, "I sense the neoconservatives are jumping around Washington, getting their ammunition ready because they know this man, in the end, will come over to their bidding."

On November 22, 2021, Stone penned an op-ed on The Hollywood Reporter, criticizing both former president Donald Trump and president Joe Biden for not declassifying all records on the assassination of John F. Kennedy.

Holocaust controversy

In a January 2010 press conference announcing his documentary series on the history of the United States, he said: "Hitler is an easy scapegoat throughout history and it's been used cheaply. He's the product of a series of actions. It's cause and effect". Just before commenting about Hitler, he mentioned Stalin: "We can't judge people as only 'bad' or 'good. In response to Stone's comment about his intention to place Hitler "in context", Rabbi Marvin Hier of the Simon Wiesenthal Center said it "is like placing cancer in context, instead of recognizing cancer for what it really is—a horrible disease."

Interviewed by London's Sunday Times on July 25, 2010, Stone said: "Hitler did far more damage to the Russians than the Jewish people, 25 or 30 [million killed]". He objected to what he termed "the Jewish domination of the media", appearing to be critical of the coverage of the Holocaust, adding "There's a major lobby in the United States. They are hard workers. They stay on top of every comment, the most powerful lobby in Washington. Israel has fucked up United States foreign policy for years." The remarks were criticized by Jewish groups, including the American Jewish Committee which compared his comments negatively to those of Mel Gibson. Abraham Foxman of the Anti-Defamation League (ADL) said, "Oliver Stone has once again shown his conspiratorial colors with his comments about 'Jewish domination of the media' and control over U.S. foreign policy. His words conjure up some of the most stereotypical and conspiratorial notions of undue Jewish power and influence."

Yuli Edelstein, the speaker of Israel's Knesset and the leading Soviet refusenik, described Stone's remarks as what "could be a sequel to The Protocols of the Elders of Zion", as well as from Israel's Diaspora Affairs and Public Diplomacy Minister.

A day later, Stone stated:

In trying to make a broader historical point about the range of atrocities the Germans committed against many people, I made a clumsy association about the Holocaust, for which I am sorry and I regret. Jews obviously do not control media or any other industry. The fact that the Holocaust is still a very important, vivid and current matter today is, in fact, a great credit to the very hard work of a broad coalition of people committed to the remembrance of this atrocity—and it was an atrocity.

Two days later, Stone issued a second apology to the ADL, which was accepted. "I believe he now understands the issues and where he was wrong, and this puts an end to the matter," Foxman said.

WikiLeaks
Oliver Stone is a vocal supporter of WikiLeaks founder Julian Assange. Stone signed a petition in support of Assange's bid for political asylum in June 2012. In August 2012, he penned a New York Times op-ed with filmmaker Michael Moore on the importance of WikiLeaks and free speech. Stone visited Assange in the Ecuadorian Embassy in April 2013 and commented, "I don't think most people in the US realize how important WikiLeaks is and why Julian's case needs support." He also criticized the documentary We Steal Secrets: The Story of WikiLeaks and the film The Fifth Estate, saying "Julian Assange did much for free speech and is now being victimised by the abusers of that concept".

In June 2013, Stone and numerous other celebrities appeared in a video showing support for Chelsea Manning.

Foreign policy 
Stone called Saudi Arabia a major destabilizer in the Middle East. He also criticized the foreign policy of the United States, saying: "We made a mess out of Iraq, Syria, Libya, but it doesn't matter to the American public. It's okay to wreck the Middle East." He has also been frequently critical of Israel.

Stone has had an interest in Latin America since the 1980s, when he directed Salvador, and later returned to make his documentary South of the Border about the left-leaning movements that had been taking hold in the region. He has expressed the view that these movements are a positive step toward political and economic autonomy for the region. He supported Venezuelan president Hugo Chávez and admired the Colombian militant group FARC.

Stone has criticized the U.S.–supported Operation Condor, a state terror operation that carried out assassinations and disappearances in support of South America's right-wing dictatorships in Argentina (see Dirty War), Bolivia, Brazil, Chile, Paraguay, and Uruguay.

In December 2014, Stone made statements supporting the Russian government's narrative on Ukraine, portraying the 2014 Ukrainian revolution as a CIA plot. He also rejects the claim that former Ukrainian president (who was overthrown as a result of the 2014 Ukrainian revolution) Viktor Yanukovych was responsible for the killing of protesters as claimed by the succeeding Ukrainian government. Stone said Yanukovych was the legitimate president who was forced to leave Ukraine by "well-armed, neo-Nazi radicals". He said that in "the tragic aftermath of this coup, the West has maintained the dominant narrative of 'Russia in Crimea' whereas the true narrative is 'USA in Ukraine'". The University of Toronto's Stephen Velychenko, the author of several books on Ukrainian history, and James Kirchick of The Daily Beast criticized Stone's comments and plans for a film (Ukraine on Fire, 2016). After the 2022 Russian invasion of Ukraine Stone said that "Russia was wrong to invade." However, he continued to put the blame for the conflict on the U.S. and NATO, emphasizing his fear of a potential nuclear war and accusing the U.S. of seeking to dominate the world.

In a June 2017 interview with The Nation to promote his documentary on Vladimir Putin, Stone rejected the narrative of the United States' intelligence agencies that Russia sought to influence the 2016 presidential election. Stone accused the CIA, FBI, and NSA of cooking the intelligence. He said: "The influence on the election from the Russians to me is absurd to the naked eye. Israel has far more influence on American elections through AIPAC. Saudi Arabia has influence through money... Sheldon Adelson and the Koch brothers have much more influence on American elections... And the prime minister of Israel comes to our country and addresses Congress to criticize the president's policy in Iran at the time—that's pretty outrageous."

Russia passed a law in 2013 banning gay propaganda to minors, which has been criticized as being used for a crackdown on LGBTQ support. In a 2019 interview with Putin, Stone said of the law that "It seems like maybe that's a sensible law". Stone later said he's not anti-gay/LGBTQ.

Stone took the Russian Sputnik V vaccine for the COVID-19 virus while filming in Russia. He also said it was "madness" that their vaccine was being ignored, and further added, "Russia's been one of the most advanced countries, if not the most advanced country."

Filmography

Film

Television

Documentary films

Other credits

Awards and nominations

Academy Awards

Best Picture

Best Director

Best Original Screenplay

Best Adapted Screenplay

BAFTA Awards

Best Direction

Best Adapted Screenplay

Golden Globe Awards

Best Director

Best Screenplay

Golden Raspberry Awards

Worst Director

Worst Screenplay

Honours 
  Commander of the Order of Intellectual Merit (Morocco, 2003)
 2007: Lifetime Achievement Award of Zurich Film Festival

Bibliography

Books
 Oliver Stone's Platoon & Salvador. Co-authored with Richard Boyle. New York: Vintage Books, 1987. . 254 pages.
 JFK: The Book of the Film: The Documented Screenplay. Co-authored with Zachary Sklar. Hal Leonard Corporation, 1992. 
 A Child's Night Dream: A Novel. New York: Macmillan, 1998. 
 Oliver Stone: Interviews. University Press of Mississippi, 2001. 
 Last Word: My Indictment of the CIA in the Murder of JFK. Co-authored with Mark Lane & Robert K. Tanenbaum. New York: Skyhorse Publishing, 2012. 
 The Untold History of the United States. Co-authored by Peter Kuznick. New York: Simon & Schuster, 2012. 
 The Putin Interviews. New York: Skyhorse Publishing, 2017. 
  Chasing the Light: Writing, Directing, and Surviving Platoon, Midnight Express, Scarface, Salvador, and the Movie Game (July 2020)

Interviews
 Crowdus, Gary. "Clarifying the Conspiracy: An Interview with Oliver Stone". Cinéaste, Vol. 19, No. 1, 1992. pp. 25–27. 
 Long, Camilla. "Oliver Stone: Lobbing Grenades in All Directions". Archived from the original. The Sunday Times, July 25, 2010.
 Louis Theroux, January 4, 2021, BBC Radio 4 'Grounded' (Omits mention of: Stone's support for whistleblower Julian Assange; "JFK"; "The Untold History of the United States".) https://www.bbc.co.uk/sounds/play/p091pfzv

Screenplays
 Snowden: Official Motion Picture Edition. Co-authored with Kieran Fitzgerald. Skyhorse Publishing, 2016.

See also
The Untold History of the United States

References

Further reading
Articles
 Wills, Garry. "Dostoyevsky Behind a Camera: Oliver Stone is Making Great American Novels on Film". The Atlantic Monthly, Vol. 280, No. 1, July 1997. pp. 96–101.

Books
 Hamburg, Eric. Nixon: An Oliver Stone Film. New York: Hyperion Books. . 598 pages.
 Riordan, James. Stone: The Controversies, Excesses, and Exploits of a Radical Filmmaker. New York: Hyperion Books, 1996. . 618 pages.
 Salewicz, Chris. Oliver Stone: The Making of His Movies. New York: Thunder's Mouth Press. . 143 pages.
 Scott, Ian and Henry Thompson. The Cinema of Oliver Stone: Art, Authorship and Activism. Manchester University Press, 2016.

External links

 The Oliver Stone Experience (official Oliver Stone website)
 
 A biography of Oliver Stone
 Oliver Stone Bibliography (via UC Berkeley)
 Oliver Stone, an Independent American Director
 

1946 births
20th-century American screenwriters
21st-century American screenwriters
21st-century American male writers
21st-century American non-fiction writers
21st-century Buddhists
American anti–Vietnam War activists
American Buddhists
American conspiracy theorists
American documentary filmmakers
American former Protestants
American humanists
American male non-fiction writers
American male screenwriters
American military personnel of the Vietnam War
American people of French descent
American people of Jewish descent
American political writers
American sailors
American shooting survivors
American taxi drivers
Best Adapted Screenplay Academy Award winners
Best Directing Academy Award winners
Best Director BAFTA Award winners
Best Director Golden Globe winners
Best Screenplay Golden Globe winners
Converts to Buddhism
Directors Guild of America Award winners
Honorary Golden Bear recipients
Film directors from Connecticut
Film directors from New York City
Former Anglicans
HuffPost writers and columnists
Independent Spirit Award for Best Director winners
John F. Kennedy conspiracy theorists
Living people
Military personnel from New York City
Military personnel from New York (state)
Non-interventionism
Researchers of the assassination of John F. Kennedy
Screenwriters from New York (state)
Silver Bear for Best Director recipients
The Hill School alumni
Tisch School of the Arts alumni
Trinity School (New York City) alumni
United States Army personnel of the Vietnam War
United States Army soldiers
United States Merchant Mariners
Writers from Manhattan
Writers from Stamford, Connecticut
Writers Guild of America Award winners
Yale University alumni
Postmodernist filmmakers